Arnaud Destatte (born 26 July 1988) is a Belgian sprinter, who specializes in the 400 metres.

Achievements

References

External links
 

1988 births
Living people
Belgian male sprinters
European Athletics Championships medalists